Keith Adam Nelson is an American physical chemist, currently the Haslam and Dewey Professor of Chemistry at Massachusetts Institute of Technology.

Education and career 
Nelson studied chemistry at Stanford University and received his B.S. in 1976, followed by a Ph.D. in physical chemistry at the same university in 1981. His thesis was supervised by Michael D. Fayer. Nelson then spent a year at University of California, Los Angeles as a postdoc with John P. McTague before joining Massachusetts Institute of Technology as a faculty member in the department of chemistry in 1982.

Honors and awards 
Nelson won the 2021 William F. Meggars Award from the Optical Society of America "for expanding the horizons of impulsive stimulated Raman scattering (ISRS) to the generation of intense tunable terahertz pulses, thus establishing new transient-grating techniques for a more effective application of time-domain coherent nonlinear spectroscopy in the study of condensed phase molecular dynamics".

References

Year of birth missing (living people)
Living people
Massachusetts Institute of Technology School of Science faculty
21st-century American chemists
Stanford University alumni